David Dolníček (born February 6, 1979) is a Czech professional ice hockey player. He currently plays with SK Horácká Slavia Třebíč in the First National Hockey League.

Dolníček made his Czech Extraliga debut playing with HC Kometa Brno debut during the 2012–13 Czech Extraliga season.

References

External links

1979 births
Living people
Czech ice hockey forwards
HC Kometa Brno players
SK Horácká Slavia Třebíč players
HC Dukla Jihlava players